Cox's sphenomorphus (Pinoyscincus coxi) is a species of skink, a lizard in the family Scincidae. The species is endemic to the Philippines. There are two recognized subspecies.

Etymology
The specific name, coxi, is in honor of Alvin J. Cox who was Director of the Philippines Bureau of Science.

Habitat

Reproduction
The mode of reproduction of P. coxi is unknown.

Subspecies
Two subspecies are recognized as being valid, including the nominotypical subspecies.
Pinoyscincus coxi coxi 
Pinoyscincus coxi divergens 

Nota bene: A trinomial authority in parentheses indicates that the subspecies was originally described in a genus other than Pinoyscincus.

References

Further reading
Linkem CW, Diesmos AC, Brown RM (2011). "Molecular systematics of the Philippine forest skinks (Squamata: Scincidae: Sphenomorphus): testing morphological hypotheses of interspecific relationships". Zoological Journal of the Linnean Society 163 (4): 1217–1243. (Pinoyscincus coxi, new combination).
Taylor EH (1915). "New species of Philippine lizards". Philippine Journal of Science, Section D, General Biology, Ethnology, and Anthropology 10 (2): 89–109 + Plate I. (Sphenomorphus coxi, new species, pp. 100–101 + Plate I, figures 3 & 4).
Taylor EH (1922). The Lizards of the Philippine Islands. Manila: Government of the Philippine Islands, Department of Agriculture and Natural Resources, Bureau of Science. Publication No. 17. 269 pp. + Plates 1–22. (Sphenomorphus jagorii divergens, new subspecies, p. 194).

Pinoyscincus

Reptiles described in 1915
Taxa named by Edward Harrison Taylor